Paint Creek may refer to:

 Paint Creek (Iowa), a tributary of the Upper Mississippi River
 Paint Creek (Kansas)
 Paint Creek (Johnson County, Kentucky), a tributary of the Levisa Fork
 Paint Creek (Oakland County, Michigan), a tributary of the Clinton River
 Paint Creek (Washtenaw County, Michigan), a tributary of Stony Creek
 Paint Creek (Montana), a stream in Flathead County
 Paint Creek (Scioto River), a tributary of the Scioto River in Ohio
 Paint Creek (Sevenmile Creek), a stream in Preble County, Ohio
 Paint Creek, Texas, an unincorporated community in Haskell County
 Paint Creek (West Virginia), a tributary of the Kanawha River
 Paint  Creek Township, Allamakee County, Iowa